The 2008 Harlow District Council election took place on 1 May 2008 to elect members of Harlow District Council in Essex, England. One third of the council was up for election and the Conservative party gained overall control of the council from no overall control.

After the election, including the delayed election in Harlow Common, the composition of the council was
Conservative 19
Liberal Democrats 8
Labour 6

Background
After the last election in 2007 both the Conservative and Labour parties had 12 seats, the Liberal Democrats had 8 and there was 1 independent councillor. However, in October 2007 the Conservatives gained a seat from Labour in Toddbrook to move to 13 seats, while Labour dropped to 11.

Before the election the council was run by a coalition between Labour and the Liberal Democrats, which had held power in Harlow since 2004. Among the councillors to stand down at the election were Liberal Democrat Su Lawton of Staple Tye ward and independent, former Conservative, John Paul Goddard of Sumners and Kingsmoor.

The election in Harlow Common ward was delayed until 12 June 2008, after the death of Labour councillor Gregory Peck in April 2008.

Election result
The Conservatives gained a majority on the council after gaining 5 seats on the day of the May election, while Labour lost 4 seats. The Conservatives took seats from Labour in Little Parndon and Hare Street and Toddbrook, from the Liberal Democrats in Netteswell and Staple Tye and from an independent in Sumners and Kingsmoor. This meant the Conservatives took 8 of the 10 seats contested and finished the day with 18 councillors.

Labour failed to win any seats and dropped to 6 councillors after also losing 2 seats to the Liberal Democrats. The Liberal Democrat gains from Labour came in Bush Fair and Mark Hall wards and meant they stayed on 8 councillors. Overall turnout at the election was 33.80%, down from 34.75% at the 2007 election.

The delayed election in Harlow Common took place on 12 June 2008 and the Conservatives gained another seat from Labour with a majority of 331 votes. This increased the Conservative's majority on the council to 5 seats, with them having 19 of the 33 councillors.

The above totals include the delayed election in Harlow Common on 12 June 2008.

Ward results

Bush Fair

Church Langley

Great Parndon

Little Parndon and Hare Street

Mark Hall

Netteswell

Old Harlow

Staple Tye

Sumners and Kingsmoor

Toddbrook

Harlow Common delayed election

By-elections between 2008 and 2010
A by-election was held in Staple Tye on 30 April 2009 after councillor David Kirton was disqualified for not attending any meetings for 6 months. David Kirton had been elected as a Conservative, but was suspended from the party in October 2008 after being charged by police and was then an independent councillor.

The seat was gained for the Liberal Democrats by John Strachan with a majority of 60 votes over the Conservatives.

References

2008
2008 English local elections
2000s in Essex